Vidhyanagar is a village in Kapilvastu District in the Lumbini Zone of southern Nepal. At the time of the 1991 Nepal census it had a population of 3315 people living in 538 individual households.

Formerly, Vidhyanagar was a village development committee (VDC), which were local-level administrative units. In 2017, the government of Nepal restructured local government in line with the 2015 constitution and VDCs were discontinued.

References

Populated places in Kapilvastu District